Çoban Mustafa Pasha ("Mustafa Pasha the Shepherd"; died 1529) was an Ottoman statesman. Likely born in Bosnia-Herzegovina or Serbian Sandzak, and collected through Devshirme to Janissaries, where he gradually rose through the ranks, he eventually served as kapıcıbaşı, vizier, and beylerbey for the Ottoman Empire during various parts of his life.

After serving as kapıcıbaşı ("chief gatekeeper") for some time, Mustafa was appointed a vizier in 1511 under Bayezid II, and finally beylerbey (governor) of the Egypt Eyalet (province) of the empire in 1522, serving for one year (1522–1523). He married Şahzade Sultan, a daughter of Sultan Selim I. With her, he had at least a daughter, Ayşe Hanımsultan. After her death, he married her half-sister Hatice Sultan (daughter of Selim I and Hafsa Sultan and full-sister of Sultan Süleyman I). With Hatice, he had a son Sultanzade Mehmed Bey and at least two daughters, Hanim Hanımsultan and an other whose name is unknown.  

Mustafa Pasha participated in the Siege of Belgrade in 1521 and the Siege of Rhodes the next year, both of them decisive Ottoman victories under sultan Suleiman I. During the Siege of Rhodes, he was the Serdar-ı Ekrem (the rank given to viziers in battle).

Mustafa Pasha died in 1529 on the way to the Siege of Vienna.

Legacy

In 1492, Mustafa Pasha ordered to be built the mosque in Skopje which bears his name.

At some point, Mustafa Pasha had a bridge built in Svilengrad in southern Bulgaria, and it was named after him as Mustafa Pasha Bridge (now known as Old Bridge, Svilengrad).

Mustafa Pasha's mausoleum is in Gebze, Turkey, in a complex he had built himself and which was completed in 1522.

See also
 List of Ottoman governors of Egypt

External links
 180+ pictures of the mosque in Gebze and its complex

References

Süreyya, Bey M, Nuri Akbayar, and Seyit A. Kahraman. Sicill-i Osmanî. Beşiktaş, İstanbul: Kültür Bakanlığı ile Türkiye Ekonomik ve Toplumsal Tarih Vakfı'nın ortak yayınıdır, 1996. Print.

15th-century births
1529 deaths
Ottoman governors of Egypt
16th-century Ottoman military personnel
16th-century Ottoman governors of Egypt
Pashas